Joel Lawrence Benjamin (born March 11, 1964) is an American chess player who holds the FIDE title of Grandmaster (GM). In 1998, he was voted "Grandmaster of the Year" by the U.S. Chess Federation. , his Elo rating was 2506, making him the No. 54 player in the U.S. and the 888th-highest rated player in the world.

Life and career
Benjamin is a native of Brooklyn, New York City, and grew up in the Marine Park neighborhood, where he attended PS 222. He was in the class for "intellectually gifted children". He is now a New Jersey resident, married to Deborah, and they have two children, Aidan and Amy.

He graduated from Yale University with a major in history in 1985. He became the youngest-ever U.S. chess master at age 13, a record previously held by Bobby Fischer. This record was broken by Stuart Rachels and is now held by Samuel Sevian. As a junior, he won the National Elementary championship (1976), the National Junior High championship (1978), and the National High School championship (1980–81).

Other successes included the U.S. Junior Championship in 1980. In the same year he earned the International Master title. He won the U.S. Junior Championship again in 1982, and the U.S. Open Chess Championship in 1985. He earned the Grandmaster title in 1986. Benjamin was the U.S. Chess Champion in 1987 (sharing the title with Nick de Firmian), in 1997, and in 2000. He won the Saint John Open I in 1988, and the 2000 Canadian Open Chess Championship. In 1999, he placed first at the QVB Chess Festival in Sydney. He was inducted into the World Chess Hall of Fame in Miami on May 2, 2008. He is the youngest inductee.

Benjamin is known for playing offbeat openings such as the Black Knights' Tango, and for converting very small advantages into a win.

He co-authored Unorthodox Openings along with Eric Schiller, for Batsford publishers in 1987, is a frequent contributor to Chess Life magazine and other chess periodicals, and is a regular commentator on the Internet Chess Club, usually presenting its Game of the Week webcast. He was also the editor-in-chief and founder of the now defunct magazine Chess Chow from 1991 to 1994. His book American Grandmaster: Four Decades of Chess Adventures was a biographical work about his chess career.  His latest book is Liquidation on the Chess Board: Mastering the Transition into the Pawn Ending. He is also a frequent contributor to Chess Life Online articles on the USCF website.

Benjamin was hired as the official grandmaster consultant by IBM to help with the Deep Blue chess computer that defeated World Champion Garry Kasparov in 1997.

Benjamin appeared in the movies Searching for Bobby Fischer and Game Over: Kasparov and the Machine.

Notable games

Benjamin beat grandmaster Eduard Gufeld in the U.S. Open, Hawaii 1998:
 
Benjamin vs. Gufeld 1.e4 c5 2.Nf3 d6 3.d4 cxd4 4.Qxd4 a6 5.c4 Nf6 6.Nc3 Nc6 7.Qd2 e6 8.Be2 Be7 9.0-0 0-0 10.b3 Qa5 11.Bb2 Rd8 12.Rfd1 b5 13.cxb5 axb5 14.a3 Bb7 15.b4 Qb6 16.Qe1 Ba6 17.Qf1 Rab8 18.Rac1 d5 19.exd5 exd5 20.Na4 bxa4 21.Bxa6 Ne4 22.Bd3 Bd6 23.Rc2 Bf4 24.g3 Bh6 25.Re2 f5 26.Qh3 Rf8 27.Bb1 Rbe8 28.Ba2 Ne7 29.Ne5 Qb5 30.Rxe4 fxe4 31.Qe6+ Kh8 32.Qxh6 Nf5 33.Ng6+ Kg8 34.Rxd5

See also
 List of Jewish chess players

References

External links
 
 
 
 
 
 
 Joel Benjamin presents Internet Chess Club's Game of the Week (preview version viewable by non-members)
 "CHESS AT NEW YORK OPEN: 'IT'S LIKE A WAR'," 4/18/87
 USCF - Chess Life Online - GM Joel Benjamin

1964 births
Living people
20th-century American Jews
American chess players
American chess writers
American male non-fiction writers
Chess grandmasters
Chess Olympiad competitors
Jewish chess players
People from Marine Park, Brooklyn
Yale College alumni
21st-century American Jews